This is a list of rivers of Newfoundland and Labrador, Canada, divided by watershed. Nearly all watersheds in the province ultimately drain into the Atlantic Ocean.

East Coast of Labrador

Watersheds between Eclipse River and Groswater Bay in Labrador

Watersheds between Groswater Bay and Goose Bay in Labrador

Watersheds of Goose Bay and of Churchill River in Labrador

North shore of Belle Isle Strait (Gulf of St Lawrence) in Labrador
Labrador Sea
Belle Isle Strait
Temple Bay
Temple Brook
Pinware River
Lost River
L’Anse au Loup Brook
Forteau Brook, flowing into Forteau Bay

List of rivers of Labrador flowing into Quebec

In order from East to West:

Newfoundland

South watershed Newfoundland

Avalon Peninsula

Rivers listed from West to East:

East Coast of Newfoundland–Atlantic Ocean

In order from North to South:

Belle-Isle Strait–Newfoundland – Northwest shore

In order from North to South:

Northern Peninsula of Newfoundland

By St George, west watersheds of Newfoundland

Watersheds of Fortune Bay west of Newfoundland

Watersheds of the West coast of Newfoundland on the Gulf of St Lawrence

Rivers listed from North to South

See also
Rivers of the Americas
List of rivers of Canada

Newfoundland

Rivers